The Toyota R family was a series of inline-four gasoline automobile engines. Designed for longitudinal placement in such vehicles as the Celica and Hilux and in production from 1953 through 1997, usage faded out as many of Toyota's mainstream models moved to front-wheel drive. Overhead cam (OHC) versions featured a chain-driven camshaft.

History of the R family

R

The  R family was produced from 1953 through 1964, and was originally manufactured at the Toyota Honsha plant.

In common with new engines of the time, it was made from cast iron (both the block and the head), water cooled, used a three bearing crank, 12V electrics and a side-mounted gear-driven camshaft controlling overhead valves via pushrods in a non-cross flow head (exhaust and inlet manifolds being on the same side of the engine). An LPG version, the R-LPG, was produced for the last two years.

The R engine was the Toyota engine used in the 1958 Toyota Crown, the first model to be exported to the United States. Road & Track was unimpressed with the engine on its introduction, noting that it idled quietly but was "not capable of very high revolutions per minute."

Applications:
 1953–1955 Toyota Super
 1955–1956 Toyota Master
 1955–1958 Toyota Crown

2R
The  2R family was produced from 1964 through 1971.

Again, an LPG version, the 2R-LPG, was produced alongside the gasoline version. Production had been gradually transferred from the original Honsha plant to the new Toyota Kamigo plant in 1968.

Applications:
 1964 – Jan 1970 Toyota Corona RT40/RT46V/RT50/RT56
 Feb 1970 – Jan 1971 Toyota Corona RT80/90/86V
 1968–1971 Toyota Mark II
 Toyota Bus RH15B
 1965–1967 Toyota Stout RK43/RK47
 Toyota ToyoAce PK41
 Toyota Hilux RN10

3R

The  3R family was produced from 1959 through 1968.

When introduced it had a 7.7:1 compression ratio. In 1960 the 3R was uprated to 8:1 and the 3R-B version was offered from 1960 through 1968 with the old 7.7:1 compression ratio. The 3R-C was introduced to comply with California emissions laws. The 3R-LPG variant was produced for the last five years.

Applications:
 1963–1968 Toyota Dyna
 1964–1967 Toyota Stout, originally 
 1969–? Toyota Hilux
 1967–1969 Toyota Corona (US)
 1959–1967 Toyota Crown
 1960–1967 Toyopet Masterline

4R
The  4R family was produced from 1965 through 1968.

Applications:
 1967 Toyota Corona (Japan)
 1967 Toyota 1600GT (Japan)

5R
The  5R family was produced from 1968 through 1986. An LPG version, the 5R-LPG, was produced from 1968 through 1983.

It is a 2-valve OHV engine.

Applications:
Toyota Crown: third through sixth generation (RS50, RS60/66, RS80/RS100, and RS110). Only with LPG for taxi use in the last two generations.
1969-1977 Toyota Coaster RU18/RU19
Toyota Dyna RU10/RU20/RU30
Toyota Stout RK101
Toyota ToyoAce RY20
Aug 1981–? Toyota Corona sixth generation (RT131), only LPG combined with automatic transmission.

6R
The  6R was produced from 1969 through 1974. The 6R-B was produced those same years, while the natural gas powered 6R-LPG was produced from 1970 through 1973.

Applications
 Sep 1970 – Jul 1973 Toyota Corona RT84/94
 Jan 1972 – Aug 1973 Toyota Mark II RX16V –

7R
The  7R was produced from 1968 through 1971 with a twin throat down-draft carburettor.
The 7R-B was produced from 1968 through 1969 with dual SU carburetors and higher compression.
The 7R-LPG was produced from 1969 through 1970.

The 7R was similar in displacement and technology to the 4R except the wider  bore and shorter  stroke of the 7R gave different power characteristics.

Applications:
 1968–1970 Toyota Corona (RT41 sedan, RT53 hardtop, RT54 hardtop)
 1970 Toyota Corona (RT82 sedan)
 1968–1970 Toyota Corona Mark II (RT6x)
 1968–1971 Toyota Corona Mark II Wagon (RT76D)

8R
The  8R The engine was produced from 1968 through 1973.
It was also available as the 8R-D, dual SU 8R-B, EFI 8R-E, Californian-spec 8R-C and DOHC 8R-G.

It was a major departure for the R family.  With a 2-valve SOHC head, it impressed contemporary reviewers – Road & Track praised its quietness and free-revving nature.

The 8R engine has a closed chamber head vs the open chamber of the 18R-C. The 8R-B has dual side draft SU-type Aisan carburettors with the float bowl under the body and vacuum activated power valves with strangle plates for chokes and liquid cooled intake with a balance tube.

Toyota upped the ante again with the DOHC (but still 2-valve) 8R-G, produced from 1969 through 1972. From 1969 to Feb 1971 it was known as the 10R, but along with a removal of the tensioner gear in the interest of quieter operation, it was renamed the 8R-G to reflect the decision that twin-cam engines were henceforth to be identified by a "-G" suffix. 4,931 twin cam engines were built, all installed in the Toyota Corona Mark II (RT72) 1900 GSS.

Applications:
 1970–1971 Toyota Hilux, 
 1971–1973 Toyota Corona 1900 hardtop
 Toyota Corona Mark II RT72 Corona Mark II 1900 hardtop
 Toyota Corona Mark II RT72 Corona Mark II 1900 hardtop GSS (8R-G)

9R
The  9R was produced from 1967 through 1968. Bore and stroke .

It was essentially a 4R with a DOHC head designed by Yamaha. The cam lobes activated the valves directly via a bucket over shim arrangement. This same arrangement was used on the 2M, 8R-G, 10R, 18R-G, 2T-G, 4A-GE and 3T-GTE engines (all designed by Yamaha).

A total of 2,229 9R engines were built.

Applications:
 Toyota Corona RT55 Corona 1600 GT hardtop

10R
The twin cam  10R was produced from 1967 through Feb 1971, when it was renamed the 8R-G. The later 8R-G version did not receive a timing chain tensioner in an effort to make it more silent.

Applications:
 Toyota Corona Mark II RT75 Corona Mark II GSS

12R
The  12R was produced from 1969 through 1988. It was also built in the Philippines as the 12R-M, by Toyota's local affiliate Delta Motors Corporation.
Technical Specs (Finnish Owner's Manual from 1973 Corona Mark 1)
– Four cylinder, 4-stroke, OHV 
– Bore × stroke:  
– Compression ratio: 8.5:1 
– Maximum power:  at 5400 rpm SAE

The 12R-LPG, was produced from 1969 through 1983.
Technical Specs: 1975  redline 4,400 rpm

Applications:
 1971–1978 Toyota Corona
 1971–1972 Toyota Hilux
 1977 Toyota Hiace
 1975 Toyota Hiace Commercial Camper
 1976 Daihatsu Taft (F20)
 Delta Mini Cruiser/Explorer

16R 
The OHC  16R was produced from 1974 through 1980. The 16R-B was produced for the first two years. There was also a 16R-J version for various commercial vehicle applications.

Applications:
 Oct 1975 – Feb 1977 Toyota Carina RA10/16
Toyota Mark II Van RX37V (16R-J), 
Toyota Corona RT102/112/117 (sedan/hardtop/wagon)
Toyota Corona RT108V (van; 16R-J)
Toyota Corona RT137V (van; 16R-J)
Toyota HiAce RH12/14/17/41 (16R-J)

18R 

The 2-valve, SOHC versions were as follows:

Applications:
 18R/18R-C/18R-U/18R-E
 1972 Toyota Corona 2000
 1972 Toyota Corona 2000 MK. II
 1972 Toyota Celica 2000
 197X Toyota Cressida 2000/Gen1
Toyota Hilux, 89 PS
 18R-C
 1972–1974 Toyota Hilux, 
 1974–1981 Toyota Celica 2000
 1980–1981 Toyota Corona Liftback (RT132, Australia)

18R-G 

The 2-valve DOHC 18R-G and its variations were produced from 1973 to 1982, replacing the 8R-G and providing a performance engine which took advantage of the entire 2-litre limit of Japan's "small car" class. While most 18R-Gs had a head designed and made by Yamaha, a very few had Toyota heads. Yamaha's tuning-fork logo can be seen on the Yamaha heads. Except for the head and related timing components, most parts were shared or interchangeable with the SOHC 18R. Combustion chambers were hemispheric.

In 1975, air injection was added to the Japan-market 18R-GR for improved emissions. This used Solex carburettors. A fuel injected and catalyzed Japan-market version, the 18R-GEU, was produced from 1978 through 1982. There was also a catalyzed carburetted version, the 18R-GU.

Competition versions of the 18R-G and -GE include those used in rally Celicas of the period, one of which finished second in the 1977 RAC Rally. The Group 4 rally version of the 152E had two twin-choke carburettors, and developed  at 9000 rpm. German racing team Schnitzer also developed a turbocharged silhouette racing version of the Celica, to take on the Porsche 935. With a KKK  turbocharger, the Group 5 Celica developed  but reliability was less than satisfactory.

Applications:
 1973–1981 Toyota Celica GT 2000
 1982–1983 Toyota Celica GT 2000 (RA63)
 1974–1983 Toyota Carina GT 2000
 1978–1983 Toyota Celica Camry GT 2000
 1973–1982 Toyota Corona GT 2000

19R
The 2-valve SOHC  19R was produced from 1974 through 1977. Its dimensions are the same as of the 18R, but it featured TTC-V, Toyota's licensed version of Honda's CVCC stratified charge combustion system. The 19R was a short-lived experiment by Toyota, and was only offered in Japanese market cars.

Applications:
 1974–1977 Carina RA13/RA31
 1974–1977 Corona RT103/RT123

20R
The 2-valve SOHC  20R was produced from 1975 through 1980. Aluminum alloy heads were used.

The 20R and subsequent models featured important design changes relative to the earlier SOHC R-series engines.  The head was changed from a reverse-flow to a cross-flow type with hemispherical combustion chambers and shorter valve rockers.  The timing chain was strengthened.  The lower block bearings were strengthened against wear, safeguarding oil pressure, and the stroke was lengthened.  The changes increased torque substantially and shifted peak power and torque towards the lower speed range.  The later R series engines did much to establish Toyota's reputation for reliability, which had previously been indifferent at best.

Applications:
 1975–1980 Toyota Hilux
 1975–1980 Toyota Celica (U.S. Version)
 1975–1980 Toyota Corona (U.S. Version)
 Toyota Stout (RK110/111)
 Toyota Coaster (RB11)

21R
The 2-valve SOHC  21R was produced from 1978 through 1987.

Air injection and federally compliant emissions equipment for the 21R-C (1982–1985) dropped power down to  SAE net at 5,000 rpm.

Applications:
 1978–1982 Toyota Carina RA46-A, RA56-A
 1978–1981 Toyota Celica RA46-B
 1981–1983 Toyota Celica RA60-B
 1978–1983 Toyota Corona RT133
 1978–1980 Toyota Cressida/Corona Mark II/Chaser RX40, RX41
 1980–1983 Toyota Cressida/Corona Mark II RX60
 1979–198? Toyota HiAce Wagon RH23G

22R

The 2-valve SOHC  22R was produced from 1981 through 1997.

The first fuel injected 22R-E engines appeared in August 1982.

Many parts from the newer 22R/R-E are not compatible with those from the older pre-1985 engine. Non-compatible parts include the cylinder head, block, pistons and many of the associated parts such as the timing chain and cover, and water and oil pumps (although the oil pump internals are the same).
These changes also affected the 22R, therefore one can consider the 85–95 22R-E as a fuel injected version of the 85–90 22R with only minor differences, if any.

Toyota swapped the dual-row timing chain used in older engines for a single-row chain with plastic guides in 1983. The new system reduced drag on the engine but introduced a new maintenance problem. The timing chain then impacts the plastic driver's side chain guide, breaking it within a short period of time and creating a noticeable chattering sound in the front of the engine, especially when cold. If the engine continues to be operated without the guide restraint, the chain will vibrate excessively on the driver's side and stretch rapidly. The result is any of several failure modes.

First, the loose chain will reduce ignition timing accuracy, which usually results in noticeably rough running. Second, it may jump a tooth on the drive sprocket or break entirely, which almost always results in major damage to an interference engine. Third, the stretched chain can slap against the side of the timing cover and wear through the metal into the coolant passage behind the water pump, resulting in major damage to both the oil and cooling systems (sometimes mis-diagnosed as a head gasket failure). The damaged aluminum timing cover is difficult to repair effectively and is typically replaced after such an event. Aftermarket timing-chain kits for the 22R/R-E typically include steel-backed guides that do not readily break even after the initial chain stretching has occurred, permitting the chain to run beyond the  point without further incident. However, some Toyota mechanics will recommend the plastic guides as they will break when the timing chain is stretched; When the guides break a noticeable chatter is heard from the timing chain slapping on the cover, warning the operator of a worn timing chain.

These engines are extremely well known for their durability, decent fuel efficiency and good low to mid range torque.

However, its weakness is high-end power. The 22R has a large displacement and a strong block, but its comparatively long stroke and restrictive head limit its use in high revving applications. Thus, the Toyota 18R-G, 2T-G, 4A-GE and 3S-GE 4-cylinder engines are better suited for performance applications.

A popular modification to the early 22R is to use a 20R head. Unlike popular lore, the 20R head does not have smaller combustion chambers. The misunderstanding originated when the 22R came out and an advantage was its higher compression ratio, so swapping a 20R block with a 22R, there was a compression increase. The 20R head has straight ports, so can flow better than the 22R head, improving high RPM power. The 20R head is a simple bolt-on modification for the pre-1985 block, but also requires the use of the 20R intake manifold, making it almost impossible (there's a lot of matching necessary) to use with the 22R-E EFI system. For blocks 1985 and onwards, further modifications are required.

Applications:
 22R
 1981 Toyota Corona
 1981–1997 Toyota Hilux
 1981–1984 Toyota Celica
 1991 Toyota Cressida
 1981–1995 Toyota Pickup
 1984 Toyota 4Runner
 1984–1989 Toyota Land Cruiser II, Bundera
 22R-E
 1985–1995 Toyota Hilux
 1983–1985 Toyota Celica
 1983–1987 Toyota Corona RT142
 1984–1995 Toyota Pickup
 1985–1995 Toyota 4Runner
 1989–1997 Volkswagen Taro
 22R-TE
 late 1985–1988 Toyota Hilux
 1986–1987 Toyota 4Runner

References

See also

 List of Toyota engines
 22R Tech Notes (Toysport)
 Toyota 20R engines: details and photos (Toyoland)

R